Ukraine competed at the 1997 Summer Universiade in Sicily, Italy, from 20 to 31 August 1995. The country was represented in athletics (41 competitors), fencing (20), swimming (16), football (15), artistic gymnastics (10), diving (6), tennis (4), and rhythmic gymnastics (2). Ukraine did not compete in basketball, volleyball, and water polo. Ukraine was the most successful team in fencing, winning the most medals and a medal in each men's competition. Men's football team finished 4th.

Medal summary

Medal by sports

Medalists

See also
 Ukraine at the 1997 Winter Universiade

References

Nations at the 1997 Summer Universiade
1997 in Ukrainian sport
1997